Frank Shipley Collins (1848–1920) was an American botanist and algologist specializing in the study of marine algae. He was a pioneer in the study of the distribution of algae on the Atlantic seaboard and Bermudas and was the leading American algologist of his time. He wrote The Green Algae of North America and Working Key to the Genera of North American Algae. Several species bear his name in his honor, including Collinsiella tuberculata (green algae in the order Ulotrichales), and Phaeosaccion collinsii.

References

 

 

American botanists
1848 births
1920 deaths